The Teton–Yellowstone tornado was a rare high-altitude tornado which occurred on July 21, 1987, in the U.S. state of Wyoming. Rated at F4 on the Fujita scale, it remains the strongest tornado ever recorded in the state and the only recorded F4/EF4 tornado in Wyoming history. The tornado cut through a -long and -wide swath of the Teton Wilderness and Yellowstone National Park, crossing the Continental Divide. At the time, it was the highest-elevation tornado known, since surpassed by several others, including a 2004 tornado above 12,000 feet in California's Sequoia National Park. While no human fatalities or injuries occurred, an estimated one million trees were felled by the tornado. The tornado damage was originally thought to be the result of strong thunderstorm straight-line winds until the area was surveyed by University of Chicago severe weather meteorologist Ted Fujita and his colleagues, who published a paper in 1989 surveying the tornado's path and discussing its meteorological character.

Storm development and track 
The tornado track began in a valley to the northeast of Mount Randolph, with the tornado's initial formation estimated by Fujita at 1:28 p.m. MST. The damage path became wider and more consistent as it approached Gravel Ridge, producing a large area of tree damage to the northeast of the ridge. The tornado appeared to intensify quickly, as the damage it produced increased from F0 intensity to F4 intensity in less than five kilometers, estimated at 3 minutes of travel time. Meteorologist Ted Fujita noted that the only comparable forest damage he had seen associated with an F4 tornado had been in the Appalachian Mountains after the Murphy, North Carolina tornado of the 1974 Super Outbreak.

The tornado maintained F2-F3 intensity for the next 10 kilometers, producing a large swath of tree damage. During this period, it approached and crossed directly over Enos Lake in the Bridger–Teton National Forest. A group of nine campers near Enos Lake reported that they saw no funnel cloud, but that the storm developed quickly and a "roar like a train in the distance" was accompanied by hailstones the size of golf balls. Fujita hypothesized that because of the area's high elevation and the storm's low cloud base, no funnel cloud would have been visible. The tornado then descended into Pacific Creek Valley before climbing up to a high plateau at nearly 3,000 meters in elevation, weakening significantly. It produced more tree damage on steep slopes until it crossed the Continental Divide, damaging trees at an elevation of 10,070 feet. More severe tree damage occurred in several cirques. The tornado then crossed the drainage of Falcon Creek before descending into the Yellowstone River Valley, gradually weakening as it did so. The damage path became more sporadic until it disappeared on the valley's far eastern side, with the tornado's time of dissipation calculated to have been 1:54 p.m. MST.

Summary 

Aftermath 
No casualties resulted from the tornado, though as many as twelve people were trapped in the backcountry by the storm. Trail maintenance crews and other federal workers labored for weeks to clear approximately 15 miles of trail blocked by the downed trees, and the total cost of the damage was recorded as $2.5 million.

Discovery and study 
After the July 23 report of a massive blowdown in the Teton Wilderness by the Forest Service, Fujita arranged for multiple aerial surveys by Cessna aircraft of the tornado's track, resulting in more than 1,400 photographs that recorded every single damaged tree. The southernmost area of the track was also visited on foot and photographed by Fujita's colleague Bradley S. Churchill.

Timber blowdown 
In the fall of 1987, U.S. senator for Wyoming Malcolm Wallop, the Fremont County Commission, and timber groups lobbied for the ability to harvest the fallen timber from the tornado's path, arguing that it posed a threat because of wildfire and beetle infestation risks and would provide nearby lumber mills with work. The Wyoming Chapter of the Sierra Club opposed the suggestion on the grounds that the harvesting would require many miles of logging roads through wilderness and would create a dangerous precedent. In the end, much of the area burned in the Huck Snake River Complex and Mink Creek fires during the Yellowstone fires of 1988, though several thousand acres of the tornado blowdown track remained unaffected. This prevented Fujita and his colleagues from returning to perform follow-up aerial photographic surveys and site visits.

References

1987 meteorology
Climate of the Rocky Mountains
1987-07-21
Wyoming,1987-07-21
Tornadoes of 1987
Tornadoes in Wyoming
Teton County, Wyoming
Yellowstone National Park
July 1987 events in the United States